Dylan Wruck (born September 23, 1992) is a Canadian-German professional ice hockey forward. Wruck is currently playing for Löwen Frankfurt in the Deutsche Eishockey Liga (DEL).

Playing career
Dylan Wruck was SMHAAAL leading scorer in 2008–09 while playing for the Beardy's Blackhawks, where he was named league's Most Valuable Player. While playing for Beardy's, he attended the Mac's Tournament and was a Mac's Tournament Allstar. Wruck participated in the 2009 U17 World Tournament in Port Alberni, BC, with Team West for the tournament he had 2 goals and 2 assists. Team West which placed fourth, losing to Team USA in the bronze medal game, also behind Team Ontario and Team Pacific who won Gold and Silver consecutively. Wruck named Player of the Game and of the Day against Slovakia in the 2009 U-17 World Tournament. Wruck also won a Saskatchewan Pee Wee Provincial AA Championship in 2003–04.

Wruck spent four years with the Edmonton Oil Kings of the WHL, seeing action in a total of 259 games, in which he tallied 87 goals and 169 assists. A consistent two-way player, he put up 80 plus points in each of his last three seasons with the Oil Kings and was a plus 83 during this time. His team was the best team in 2011–12 winning the Scotty Munro Memorial Trophy with 107 points for the year, during the regular season. Wruck was able to confirm his good performance from the previous year and scored 80 plus points. Wruck helped the Oilkings to win the 2011-2012 WHL Championship, the Ed Chynoweth Cup, and went on to the Memorial Cup. A year later, the Oil Kings again reached the finals, but they lost to the Portland Winterhawks. In 2012–13, he won the Brad Hornung Award as the WHL Most Sportsmanlike Player of the Year. Wruck scored 104 points in 90 games in his last junior season with the Oil Kings.

In his second game as a professional, Wruck scored a hat trick during the 2013–14 season with ECHL's Ontario Reign, but his season was cut short by a shoulder injury. Wruck played only three games for the Ontario team in which he contributed 4 goals and 2 assists. On 16 January 2015, while playing for the Iserlohn Rooster of the DEL he recorded six points in the game against Düsseldorfer EG.

He took up an offer from the Iserlohn Roosters of the German elite league Deutsche Eishockey Liga (DEL) in 2014 and had 14 goals as well as 23 assists in 51 games of the 2014–15 campaign. Which was tops for a rookie that year.  Wruck was named DEL Rookie of the Year in the 2013-14 Season. In March 2015, he put pen to paper on a new two-year deal with the Roosters. In October 2015, Wruck sustained a shoulder injury which kept him out for months. He spent parts of his rehab in his native Canada, before returning to Iserlohn. In the 2016–17 season, Wruck tallied eight goals and 16 assists in 52 DEL contests. He left Iserlohn after the conclusion of the season and inked a deal with fellow DEL side Kölner Haie on May 23, 2017.

After recording just 2 assists in 35 regular season games in the 2017–18 season, Wruck left Kölner Haie and agreed to a one-year contract with his third DEL club, the Straubing Tigers, on May 2, 2018. In the 2018–19 season, Wruck compiled just 10 points in 39 games for the Tigers before leaving as a free agent at the conclusion of the season.

On June 14, 2019, Wruck continued in Germany, securing a one-year contract with DEL2 club, Heilbronner Falken. Wruck became the 2019–20 DEL2 regular season top scorer with 24 goals and 64 assists.

Career statistics

Regular season and playoffs

International

Awards and honours

References

External links 

1992 births
Living people
Canadian people of German descent
Canadian ice hockey forwards
Canadian expatriate ice hockey players in Germany
Edmonton Oil Kings players
Heilbronner Falken players
Iserlohn Roosters players
Ice hockey people from Saskatchewan
Kölner Haie players
Löwen Frankfurt players
Sportspeople from Saskatoon
Straubing Tigers players